Karl Thomas Conny Johansson (born 24 March 1975) is a Swedish retired professional tennis player and coach. He reached a career-high Association of Tennis Professionals (ATP) world No. 7 singles ranking on 10 May 2002. His career highlights in singles include a Grand Slam title at the Australian Open in 2002, and an ATP Masters Series title at the 1999 Canada Masters. He also won a silver medal at the 2008 Summer Olympics in men's doubles, partnering Simon Aspelin.

As of 2023, Johansson remains the last Swedish man to win a major in singles.

He is currently the coach of Sorana Cirstea.

Tennis career

Juniors
Johansson began to play tennis at age five with his father, Krister. In 1989, became European 14s singles champion and won doubles title (with Magnus Norman). Even when he injured his right elbow while playing the Orange Bowl tennis championships 16s in 1991, he still reached the final, losing to Spain's Gonzalo Corrales. He finished No. 10 in the 1993 world junior rankings.

Professional career
That same year he joined the pro tour for the first time, and turned pro the following year. He has managed to win 9 top-level singles titles and 1 doubles title, including the 1999 Canada Masters, defeating world No. 4 Yevgeny Kafelnikov from a set down, and the 2002 Australian Open, which he unexpectedly won (while having never progressed beyond the quarterfinals of any of his 24 previous Grand Slams) after defeating Jacobo Díaz, Markus Hipfl, Younes El Aynaoui, Adrian Voinea, Jonas Björkman and Jiří Novák before defeating his heavily favored opponent in the final, Marat Safin, in four sets, again from a set down. Johansson became the first Swedish player to win a Slam since Stefan Edberg won the 1992 US Open title, and the first Swede to claim the Australian Open since his idol Mats Wilander in 1988.

A knee injury robbed Johansson of the latter half of the 2002 season and all of 2003, and Johansson was therefore unable to compete until the start of 2004. Many people weren't sure if Johansson will be able to compete again because of the seriousness of the injury. In 2005, he made a comeback to become the first Swedish player to reach the semifinals at Wimbledon since Edberg in 1993, and only dropped a set en route, losing to 2nd seed Andy Roddick in a tightly contested four set match that lasted a minute under 3 hours, 7–6(8–6), 2–6, 6–7(8–10), 6–7(5–7). Near the end of the season, Johansson won his 9th and last ATP tour title in St. Petersburg, defeating Nicolas Kiefer in straight sets.

In 2006, the Swede struggled through the season after suffering an eye injury early in the season. The highlights of the season were a 4th round at the Australian Open (where he lost to Ivan Ljubičić), his first doubles title in Båstad, Sweden with countryman Jonas Björkman, and a final in St. Petersburg (lost to Mario Ančić), where he was the defending champion.

At the 2008 Beijing Summer Olympics he reached the doubles final with Simon Aspelin, where he lost against the Swiss team of Roger Federer and Stan Wawrinka in 4 sets.

As of 6 March 2009, he has an 18–15 career Davis Cup record (17–12 in singles) in 17 ties, having played for Sweden every year other than 2003 (when he was out of action for the entire season) since 1998, and a 356–292 career overall.

He announced his retirement in June 2009 after a 15-year career.

Personal life
His idol while growing up was Mats Wilander, who was the captain of Swedish Davis Cup team. He is also a keen player of golf and floorball, and a fan of ice hockey. He scored two goals and assisted on another in 6–5 win by ATP Stars over National Hockey League Players in an annual street hockey challenge in Montreal in 2001. He married Gisella Kaltencher on 3 December 2005.

Equipment 
He is sponsored by Dunlop Sport for racquets and apparel, and adidas for shoes. He uses a heavily modified Dunlop Pro Revelation racquet 'paintjobbed' to look like the current Dunlop 4D Aerogel 500 racquet.

Significant finals

Grand Slam finals

Singles: 1 (1 title)

ATP Masters Series finals

Singles: 1 (1 title)

Olympics

Doubles: 1 (1 Silver)

ATP career finals

Singles: 14 (9 titles, 5 runner-ups)

Doubles: 2 (1 title, 1 runner-up)

ATP Challenger and ITF Futures finals

Singles: 4 (3–1)

Doubles: 3 (2–1)

Performance timelines

Singles 

Davis Cup matches are included in the statistics.

Doubles

Top 10 wins

See also
List of Grand Slam men's singles champions

References

External links
 
 
 
 Johansson world ranking history

1975 births
Living people
Sportspeople from Linköping
Swedish expatriate sportspeople in Monaco
Swedish male tennis players
Australian Open (tennis) champions
Tennis players at the 2000 Summer Olympics
Tennis players at the 2008 Summer Olympics
Olympic tennis players of Sweden
Olympic silver medalists for Sweden
Olympic medalists in tennis
Hopman Cup competitors
Grand Slam (tennis) champions in men's singles
Medalists at the 2008 Summer Olympics
Swedish tennis coaches
Sportspeople from Östergötland County